The 1936 Duquesne Dukes football team represented Duquesne University in the 1936 college football season. The Dukes were led by first-year head coach John "Clipper" Smith. An upset victory over cross-town rival and national powerhouse Pittsburgh thrust Duquesne into the national spotlight. Another upset victory over previously undefeated Marquette secured the team a spot in the 1937 Orange Bowl, where they defeated Mississippi State, 13–12. Duquesne was ranked 14th in the final poll of the AP Poll in its inaugural year.

Schedule

References

Duquesne
Duquesne Dukes football seasons
Orange Bowl champion seasons
Duquesne football